Robert B. Wiesenhahn, Jr. (born December 22, 1938) is an American former professional basketball player.

Early life
Wiesenhahn attended McNicholas High School in Cincinnati. He played basketball for the Rockets and graduated in 1957.

College career
Wiesenhahn played college basketball at the University of Cincinnati.

As a sophomore in 1958–59, Wiesenhahn was a starting forward on the nationally ranked team led by Oscar Robertson. Wiesenhahn averaged 6.2 points and 6.4 rebounds per game as the 26-4 Bearcats won the Missouri Valley Conference (MVC) title and advanced to the NCAA Final Four, where they finished in third place nationally.

As a junior in 1959–60, Wiesenhahn averaged 7.5 points and 6.8 rebounds per game. The Bearcats posted a 28-2 record, won the MVC title and again advanced to the Final Four, but they again had to settle for third place.

In 1961 as a senior, Wiesenhahn led the Bearcats with 17.1 points per game to go with a .481 field goal percentage and 10.0 rebounds per game as Cincinnati posted a 27-3 record and again captured the MVC crown. the Bearcats advanced to the NCAA national championship game against Ohio State, and Wiesenhahn would be guarding future Hall-of-Famer John Havlicek. The hard-nosed, defensive-minded Wiesenhahn outscored Havlicek 17 points to four and outrebounded him nine to four. The Bearcats, led by starters Wiesenhahn, Tom Thacker, Tony Yates, Paul Hogue, and Carl Bouldin, defeated the heavily-favored Buckeyes, 71-65 in overtime to claim the national crown. Wiesenhahn was named to the All-MVC team and was named first-team All-American by the Helms Foundation and by Converse.

Professional career
A 6'4", 220 lb. forward, Wiesenhahn was selected in the second round (11th overall) of the 1961 NBA draft by the Cincinnati Royals. He played one season, 1961–62, for the 43-37 Royals, and in 60 games he averaged 2.0 points and 1.9 rebounds per game.

The next season, 1962–63, he played for the American Basketball League, but the league folded in December 1962. Because of Wiesenhahn's build, athleticism and reputation for hard-nosed play, even though he never played college football, he was offered a tryout by coach George Halas and the NFL's Chicago Bears. However, with no financial guarantee and married with two children, Wiesenhahn passed on the offer.

Personal life
In 1987, Wiesenhahn was inducted into the University of Cincinnati Athletics Hall of Fame. He is also a member of the McNicholas High School Athletic Hall of Fame.

In 2014 at age 75 he continues to work out regularly and closely follows local high school basketball as well as college and NBA basketball. He has two sons and two daughters.

References

1938 births
Living people
American men's basketball players
Basketball players from Cincinnati
Cincinnati Bearcats men's basketball players
Cincinnati Royals draft picks
Cincinnati Royals players
Pittsburgh Rens players
Small forwards